Grozăvești is a metro station in Bucharest, Romania, on the Metro Line M1. It is located on the banks of the Dâmbovița River, next to Politehnica University of Bucharest (it is one of the three metro stations servicing the university), the Regie and the Grozăvești student campuses, the CET Grozăvești thermal power station, the Carrefour Orhideea shopping centre, and the impressive Basarab overpass.

Grozăvești was inaugurated on 19 November 1979 as part of the first line of the Bucharest Metro, between Semănătoarea and Timpuri Noi, and is currently servicing the M1 metro line.

The station was built employing a two-platform system, with the tracks in the center, and with exits at each end of the station, leading to a higher underground platform used as a vestibule. The station's theme colour is dark green, with walls covered in light and dark green mosaic pieces arranged at random as to not form any patterns.

References

Bucharest Metro stations
Railway stations opened in 1979
1979 establishments in Romania